Trond Andresen (born 30 April 1947) is a Norwegian academic, former communist politician, public writer and debater, broadcaster, and associate professor of Cybernetics at the Norwegian University of Science and Technology (NTNU). He served as a board member of NTNU 1999-2001, as an elected academic representative.

Career
He earned the M.Sc. degree in electrical engineering at NTH (now NTNU) in 1973, and has been assistant professor at NTNU since 1982. He was elected as a member of the university board in 1999, serving one term. He earned the dr.philos. degree in 2018 with the dissertation On the Dynamics of Money Circulation, Creation and Debt – a Control Systems Approach and was thus promoted to associate professor.

Political activity
Andresen has been a member of a number of left-wing organisations in Norway, and was a co-founder of the Red Electoral Alliance (RV) political party in 1973. In 1982, he founded a left-wing radio station affiliated with RV, Radio RV, and served as its editor until 1996. He has also freelanced for the NRK. Andresen was a columnist for the left-wing daily Klassekampen from 2000 to 2016, and also for some time moderated its online forum, launched in 2008. He was also very active in hosting and participating in the debate about the newspaper's strategy that ended with the replacement of then-editor Paul Bjerke by Jon Michelet by the owners of the paper, the Workers' Communist Party, in 1996.

Due to his membership and activity in several communist organisations, Andresen was under surveillance by the Police Surveillance Agency from 1970 until the early 1990s, and has published his dossier, which he obtained following the inquiries into the Police Surveillance Agency's activities, on the Internet.

In February 2009, Andresen left the Red party.

In recent years, Andresen has been a vocal critic of Israel. He was one of the signatories of the petition to the university board that NTNU boycott Israel, an initiative which received worldwide media attention. The initiative by 34 NTNU professors eventually failed in the university board.

In April 2015, he was asked by the Norwegian Confederation of Trade Unions not to bring a poster to the International Workers' Day stating that "whining about anti-Semitism is a derailment tactic", that he had used for several years. In 2016 he announced his support for Marine Le Pen.

Awards
In 2006, Andresen received the SINTEF Prize for Excellence in Teaching.

References

Norwegian engineers
Academic staff of the Norwegian University of Science and Technology
Red Party (Norway) politicians
Norwegian columnists
1947 births
Living people